Smokescreen or smoke screen may refer to:

Palais Royale (film), a 1988 Canadian film released under the alternative titles Smokescreen or Smoke Screen
Security smoke, generated smoke specifically used as a security measure
Smoke screen, smoke released as a military countermeasure to hide weapons, other equipment, or infantry 
Smokescreen, a non-damaging Normal-type move in the Pokémon series
Smokescreen (film), a 1964 British film
Smokescreen (Transformers), the name of several different characters in the Transformers robot superhero franchise

See also
Operation Smokescreen, a US interagency counterterrorist operation from 1995 to 2002 to disrupt fundraising by Hezbollah
"The Smoke Screen" (Yes, Prime Minister), a 1986 episode of Yes, Prime Minister
Fog display, an imaging technique